Zhang may refer to:

Chinese culture, etc.
 Zhang (surname) (張/张), common Chinese surname
 Zhang (surname 章), a rarer Chinese surname
 Zhang County (漳县), of Dingxi, Gansu
 Zhang River (漳河), a river flowing mainly in Henan
 Zhang (unit) (丈), a traditional Chinese unit of length equal to 10 chi (3–3.7 m)
 Zhang Zetian, Chinese billionaire
 璋, a type of shaped stone or jade object in ancient Chinese culture thought to hold great value and protective properties; see also Bi (jade) and Cong (jade)

Other
 Zhang, the proper name of the star Upsilon¹ Hydrae

See also
 Zang (disambiguation)